Lunga may refer to:

Places
Democratic Republic of Congo

Lunga, DRC, a town located in Katanga Province

Moldova
 Lunga, Floreşti, a commune in Floreşti district
 Lunga, Transnistria, a commune in Transnistria

Romania
 Lunga, a village in Târgu Secuiesc city, Covasna County
 Lunga, a village in Comloşu Mare Commune, Timiș County
 Lunga, a tributary of the Cheia in Vâlcea County
 Lunga, a tributary of the Bistricioara in Vâlcea County

Scotland
 Lunga, Slate Islands, one of the Slate Islands in Argyll and Bute
 Lunga, Treshnish Isles, in Argyll and Bute

Solomon Islands
 An area on Guadalcanal, including Lunga Point and Lunga River (Solomon Islands)

United States
 Lunga Park Recreation Area and Lunga Reservoir, Marine Corps Base Quantico, Virginia

Zambia
 Two rivers called Lunga River (Zambia)

See also
 Lunga, also lunga pausa, used in music notation above a fermata to extend its length
 USS Lunga Point (CVE-94)
 Lunga Lunga, a settlement in Kenya
 Lungalunga language, spoken by a small group in Papua New Guinea